De Os is an oil windmill in the Zaanse Schans, Zaanstad.

Between the saw mills Het Jonge Schaap and Het Klaverblad is the hull of the oil mill De Os. The mill was built in 1663 and is one of the oldest industrial windmills in the Zaan. Until 1916 the mill was operating on wind power. In that year, the hood and wings were removed; the Os was converted to a warehouse. The barns are now occupied by the mill. The mill body was restored in recent years.

See also 
 De Kat, Zaandam
 De Huisman, Zaandam
 De Zoeker, Zaandam
 De Gekroonde Poelenburg, Zaanse Schans
 Het Jonge Schaap, Zaandam

External links 
 Een fotoreportage met interieurfoto's
 

Windmills in North Holland
Smock mills in the Netherlands
Grinding mills in the Netherlands
Windmills completed in 1663
Zaandam
1663 establishments in the Dutch Republic